Robert Brown Hogg (born 10 May 1914 – 15 April 1975) was a Scottish football player and manager. He was mainly associated with Celtic, for which he made 575 appearances in all competitions between 1932 and 1948 (including over 200 across seven unofficial wartime seasons), winning two Scottish League titles (1935–36 and 1937–38), two Scottish Cups (1932–33 and 1936–37), plus the Coronation Cup in 1938. After leaving Celtic in 1948, he became player/manager of Alloa Athletic for a short spell.

Hogg represented Scotland once, in a 3–1 victory against Czechoslovakia in 1937. He was also selected six times by the Scottish Football League XI between 1934 and 1939.

He married the sister of St Mirren and Scotland defender George Walker in 1935.

References

1914 births
1975 deaths
Sportspeople from Larkhall
Scottish footballers
Association football fullbacks
Royal Albert F.C. players
Celtic F.C. players
Alloa Athletic F.C. players
Scottish Football League players
Scotland international footballers
Scottish Football League representative players
Scottish football managers
Alloa Athletic F.C. managers
Footballers from South Lanarkshire
Scottish Football League managers
Scotland wartime international footballers
Scottish Junior Football Association players
Scotland junior international footballers